The following is a list of notable deaths in May 1990.

Entries for each day are listed alphabetically by surname. A typical entry lists information in the following sequence:
 Name, age, country of citizenship at birth, subsequent country of citizenship (if applicable), reason for notability, cause of death (if known), and reference.

May 1990

1
Fred Blackburn, 87, British politician.
Sunset Carson, 69, American actor.
Heciyê Cindî, 82, Kurdish linguist and researcher from Armenia.
Djalma Dias, 50, Brazilian footballer, cardiopulmonary arrest.
Sergio Franchi, 64, Italian-American singer and actor, brain cancer.
Lothar Geitler, 90, Austrian botanist.
Oskar Kuhn, 82, German palaeontologist.
Rab Bruce Lockhart, 73, Scottish rugby player and academic.
Jindřich Maudr, 84, Czechoslovak wrestler.
Frits Warmolt Went, 86, Dutch-American biologist.

2
Germain Bazin, 88, French art historian.
Ronald Berndt, 73, Australian anthropologist.
Ann Casson, 74, English actress.
William L. Dawson, 90, American composer.
David Rappaport, 38, English actor, suicide by gunshot.

3
Carlos Cerutti, 21, Argentine basketball player, traffic collision.
Dovima, 62, American supermodel, liver cancer.
Audrey Ferris, 80, American actress.
Mathilda Guez, 71, French Tunisian-Israeli politician.
Karl Ibach, 75, German politician.
Shōtarō Ikenami, 67, Japanese author, leukemia.
Pimen I of Moscow, 79, Soviet patriarch of the Russian Orthodox Church (since 1970).
Mary Lea Johnson Richards, 63, American theatre producer, liver cancer.

4
Luther Clifford, 66, American baseball player.
John Ormond, 67, Welsh poet.
Emily Remler, 32, American guitarist, heart failure.
Shepard Stone, 82, American journalist.
Johnny Wright, 73, American baseball player.

5
Endre Bohem, 89, Hungarian-American filmmaker.
Walter Bruch, 82, German electrical engineer and television pioneer.
Reginald Goodall, 88, English conductor.
Jean Keller, 84, French Olympic runner (1924, 1928, 1932).
Elton Rule, 72, American television executive (American Broadcasting Company).

6
Charles Farrell, 89, American actor, heart failure.
Lotte Jacobi, 93, Prussian-American photographer.
Irmtraud Morgner, 56, German writer, cancer.
Eduardo Nicol, 83, Mexican-Catalan philosopher.

7
Ann Bishop, 90, English biologist, pneumonia.
Elizete Cardoso, 69, Brazilian singer and actress, cancer.
Ashley Lawrence, 55, New Zealand conductor.
Nicholas Sanduleak, 56, American astronomer, cardiac arrest, heart attack.
Sam Tambimuttu, 58, Sri Lankan Tamil lawyer and politician.
Charlie Walker, 78, English football player.
Prince Andrej of Yugoslavia, 60, Yugoslav royal, suicide by carbon monoxide poisoning.

8
Tomás Ó Fiaich, 66, Irish Roman Catholic cardinal, heart attack.
June James, 27, American football player, traffic collision.
Luigi Nono, 66, Italian composer.
Edsard Schlingemann, 23, Dutch Olympic swimmer (1984), traffic collision.
Rudolf Sellner, 84, German actor.

9
Lü Wei (diver), 23-24, Chinese diver, murdered.
Pauline Frederick, 82, American journalist, heart attack.
David Stuart Parker, 71, American territorial administrator, heart failure.
Misha Raitzin, 59-60, Soviet-Israeli-American singer, lung aneurysm.
George Kennedy Young, 79, British politician.

10
Hilda Buck, 75, New Zealand cricket player.
Walter Mahan, 87, American football player.
Susan Oliver, 58, American actress and aviator, colorectal cancer.
Walker Percy, 73, American philosophical writer, prostate cancer.

11
Stratos Dionysiou, 54, Greek singer, aortic aneurysm.
Heidemarie Hatheyer, 78, Austrian actress.
Winford Stokes, 39, American convicted serial killer, execution by lethal injection.
David Wade, 78, American general.
Harry Whittle, 68, British hurdler and Olympian.
Hanne Wieder, 65, German actress, cancer.
Venedikt Yerofeyev, 51, Soviet writer and dissident, throat cancer.

12
Bill Bufalino, 72, American mafia lawyer, leukemia.
John E. Davis, 77, American politician, governor of North Dakota (1957–1961).
Andrei Kirilenko, 83, Soviet statesman and politician.
Nate Monaster, 78, American scriptwriter.
Anthony Masters, 70, British production designer and set decorator.
Earl Seibert, 79, Canadian ice hockey player, brain cancer.

13
Jorge Garate, 72, Argentine film editor.
Albert Hendrickx, 73, Belgian racing cyclist.
Ray Jennison, 80, American football player.
Hans Raff, 79, German Olympic runner (1936).

14
André Amellér, 78, French composer.
Gerald T. Flynn, 79, American politician, member of the U.S. House of Representatives (1959–1961).
Tarcisio Longoni, 76, Italian politician.
Ruth Mason, 76, New Zealand botanist.
Mary Oppen, 81, American poet, ovarian cancer.
Bill Pace, 58, American football player.
Ned Pines, 84, American publisher.
Franklyn Seales, 37, American actor, AIDS.

15
Jerzy Drzewiecki, 87, Polish airplane engineer.
Peter Grimwade, 47, British television director and screenwriter, leukemia.
Anna Schchian, 84, Soviet botanist.
Yves Van Massenhove, 81, Belgian racing cyclist.
Doug Young, 81, Canadian ice hockey player.

16
Luis Aldás, 80, Argentine actor.
Rein Aren, 62, Soviet actor.
Fernando Claudín, 74, Spanish historian.
Sammy Davis Jr., 64, American singer ("The Candy Man") and actor (Ocean's 11), throat cancer.
Robert Gall, 71, French lyricist.
Jim Henson, 53, American puppeteer (The Muppets) and film director (Labyrinth, The Dark Crystal), toxic shock syndrome.
Eduardo Mateo, 49, Uruguayan singer, songwriter, and guitarist, cancer.
Pretzel Pezzullo, 79, American baseball player, cancer.
Alija Sirotanović, 75, Yugoslav udarnik.

17
Manuel Anatol, 87, French footballer.
Rudolf Breuss, 91, Austrian naturopath and pseudoscientific diet advocate.
Auguste Jordan, 81, French footballer.
Jimmy Lawrence, 76, American gridiron football player.
Detlev Peukert, 39, German historian, AIDS.
Carlos Riquelme, 76, Mexican actor.
Jackie Stewart, 68, Scottish footballer.
Frank Wright, 54, American jazz musician.

18
Joseph-Marie Trịnh Văn Căn, 69, Vietnamese Roman Catholic cardinal.
Jill Ireland, 54, English actress and singer, breast cancer.
Lorna Johnstone, 87, English equestrian.
Karl Meyer, 90, German-American biochemist.
Rafael Hernández Ochoa, 74, Mexican politician.
Yannis Spyropoulos, 78, Greek painter.
Eje Thelin, 51, Swedish trombonist.

19
Jim Balfour, 75, Australian politician.
Olive Byrne, 86, American writer.
Hector Dyer, 79, American runner and Olympic champion.
Hermann Wulf, 74, German Wehrmacht officer during World War II.

20
Bina Mossman, 97, American musician and politician.
Peter Rabe, 68, German-American author, lung cancer.
Aage Rubæk-Nielsen, 76, Danish equestrian and Olympian.
Franklin Williams, 72, American diplomat.

21
Mrs. Victor Bruce, 94, British racer.
Morris Levy, 62, American record executive, cancer.
Ed Steitz, 69, American basketball coach.
Lily von Essen, 93, Swedish tennis player.
Max Wall, 82, English actor and comedian, fall.

22
Rocky Graziano, 71, American boxer, cardiopulmonary failure.
Pat Reid, 79, British historian and soldier.
Ling Shuhua, 90, Chinese modernist writer and painter.
Leslie Spriggs, 80, British politician.

23
Affandi, 83, Indonesian artist.
Charlie Keller, 73, American baseball player.
Elliott Lewis, 72, American actor.
Giuseppe Santomaso, 82, Italian painter and educator.
Ted Tinling, 79, British-American fashion designer.

24
Jeanne de Salzmann, 101, French-Swiss choreographer.
Augie Donatelli, 75, American baseball umpire.
K. S. Hegde, 80, Indian politician and judge.
John Kendall-Carpenter, 64, English rugby player.
Jacques Lob, 57, French comic book artist.
Dries van der Lof, 70, Dutch racing driver.
Julijans Vaivods, 94, Soviet Roman Catholic cardinal.

25
D. S. Amalorpavadass, 57, Indian theologian.
Athanasios Asimakopulos, 59, Canadian economist, leukemia.
Ray Atkeson, 83, American photographer.
Hans-Werner Kraus, 74, German U-boat commander during World War II.
William Overgard, 64, American cartoonist.
Vic Tayback, 60, American actor (Alice), heart attack.
Gary Usher, 51, American musician, lung cancer.

26
Marguerite S. Church, 97, American politician, member of the U.S. House of Representatives (1951–1963).
René David, 64, French legal scholar.
Brūno Kalniņš, 91, Latvian politician and historian.
Emil Konopinski, 78, American nuclear scientist.
Don McFadyen, 83, Canadian ice hockey player.
Chris McGregor, 53, South African musician, lung cancer.
Varlen Pen, 73, Soviet Russian-Korean painter and graphic artist.
Nicole Riche, 64, French actress.

27
Heino Dissing, 77, Danish racing cyclist.
Adele Duttweiler-Bertschi, 97, Swiss philanthropist.
Emil Handschin, 62, Swiss ice hockey player.
Pyotr Lomako, 85, Soviet politician.
Jessie MacWilliams, 73, English mathematician.
Robert Baumle Meyner, 81, American politician, governor of New Jersey (1954–1962).
Mieko Takamine, 71, Japanese actress and singer.

28
Ralph Alger Bagnold, 94, English geologist.
Bill Davies, 74, Canadian football player.
Julius Eastman, 49, American musician, cardiac arrest.
Inna Gulaya, 50, Soviet actress, drug overdose.
Giorgio Manganelli, 67, Italian writer.
Taiichi Ohno, 78, Japanese industrialist (Toyota Production System).
Wilhelm Wagenfeld, 90, German industrial designer and engineer.

29
Yves Brayer, 82, French painter.
Jimmy Creighton, 84, Canadian ice hockey player, Parkinson's disease.
Bill MacKenzie, 78, Canadian ice hockey player.
Hussein Onn, 68, Malaysian politician, prime minister (1976–1981), cardiovascular disease.
Albert Spaulding, 75, American anthropologist.
Alexander Tsvetkov, 75, Bulgarian chess player.

30
Charles Morris, Baron Morris of Grasmere, 92, British academic.
John Francis Hackett, 78, American prelate of the Roman Catholic Church.
Ole Scavenius Jensen, 69, Danish Olympic rower (1952).
Wilderich Freiherr Ostman von der Leye, 66, German politician.
José Solís, 76, Spanish politician.

31
Clotario Blest, 90, Chilean unionist.
Jerzy Kaliszewski, 77, Polish actor.
Art Lund, 75, American singer.
Michael Raffetto, 90, American actor, throat cancer.
Archibald Bulloch Roosevelt, Jr., 72, American CIA agent and writer, heart failure.
Charlie Shoemaker, 50, American baseball player, suicide by gunshot.
Willy Spühler, 88, Swiss politician.

References 

1990-05
 05